With Kelly to Chitral is a book written by Major General Sir William George Laurence Beynon and originally published by Edward Arnold Publishers Ltd at 37 Bedford Street London in 1896.

The author, immediately before writing the book was Staff Officer to Colonel James Graves Kelly who marched in heavy snow over the Shandur Pass to lift the Siege of Chitral. With Kelly to Chitral provides significant insight into the daily life of British Indian Army Officers and Indian troops on a frontier expeditions.

References

1896 books
Books about military history
British non-fiction books
Military history of India
Books about British India